Thomas Chippenham was Archdeacon of York from 1470 until 1478 when he became Archdeacon of Totnes.

References

Archdeacons of York
Archdeacons of Totnes
15th-century English clergy